Ozzfest 2002 is a live recording of Ozzfest 2002. It was recorded during the concert in Boston, and has the Main Stage performances of Hard rock and other similar style bands as System of a Down, Rob Zombie and Adema. The Album also has performances of Second Stage bands such as Meshuggah and SOiL.
The album includes guest appearances from Zakk Wylde and Kelly Osbourne.

Track listing
Ozzy Osbourne - "War Pigs" - 8:03
System of a Down - "Needles" - 3:41
Rob Zombie - "More Human than Human" - 4:31
P.O.D. - "Outkast" - 5:13
Drowning Pool - "Creeping Death" - 5:32
Adema - "Freaking Out" - 3:39
Black Label Society - "Berserkers" - 5:54
Down - "Ghosts Along the Mississippi" - 5:21
Hatebreed - "A Call for Blood" - 3:14
SOiL with Zakk Wylde - "Halo" - 3:48
Flaw - "Payback" - 4:14
3rd Strike - "All Lies" - 3:33
Pulse Ultra - "Big Brother" - 3:31
Ill Niño - "Liar" - 4:39
Meshuggah - "New Millennium Cyanide Christ" - 5:21
Andrew W.K. with Kelly Osbourne - "She Is Beautiful" - 4:03

References

2002 live albums
2002 compilation albums
Ozzfest